The Flaming Signal is a 1933 American adventure film directed by George Jeske and Charles E. Roberts and starring Marceline Day, Noah Beery and Carmelita Geraghty.

Cast
 John David Horsley as Lt. Jim Robbins
 Marceline Day as Molly James 
 Noah Beery as Otto Von Krantz 
 Henry B. Walthall as Rev. Mr. James 
 Carmelita Geraghty as Molly 
 Mischa Auer as Manu—High Priest 
 Francisco Alonso as Taku 
 Jane'e Olmes as Rari 
 Anya Gramina as French Girl 
 Flash the Dog as Flash

References

Bibliography
 Michael R. Pitts. Poverty Row Studios, 1929–1940: An Illustrated History of 55 Independent Film Companies, with a Filmography for Each. McFarland & Company, 2005.

External links
 

1933 films
1933 adventure films
American adventure films
Films directed by George Jeske
1930s English-language films
1930s American films
English-language adventure films